Federal Agent is a 1936 American crime film directed by Sam Newfield and written by Barry Barringer. The film stars William Boyd, Irene Ware, Don Alvarado, Lenita Lane, George Cooper and Charles A. Browne. The film was released on April 14, 1936, by Republic Pictures.

Plot

Cast
William Boyd as Bob Woods 
Irene Ware as Helen Lynch / Helen Gray
Don Alvarado as Armand Recard
Lenita Lane as Vilma Kantos Recard
George Cooper as Agent Wilson
Charles A. Browne as Mullins
Hayden Stevenson as Federal Bureau Chief

References

External links
 

1936 films
1930s English-language films
American crime films
1936 crime films
Republic Pictures films
Films directed by Sam Newfield
American black-and-white films
1930s American films